Serpent d'océan (lit. "Serpent of the Ocean" in French) is a work by artist Huang Yong Ping. Depicting a long sea serpent skeleton, it is installed in the intertidal zone at 	Saint-Brevin-les-Pins, Loire-Atlantique, France.

Description 
Serpent d'océan is a monumental sculpture made of aluminum, 130 m long in total. It represents the skeleton of an immense imaginary sea serpent, whose vertebrae undulate to end in an open mouth.

The work is installed at the tip of the Nez-de-Chien, in Mindin, in the territory of the commune of Saint-Brevin-les-Pins in the French département of Loire-Atlantique, at the limit where the Loire estuary joins the Atlantic Ocean. It spreads out over the foreshore area: the serpent's tail is located at the low tide limit, its head at the high tide limit. The sculpture is therefore covered and uncovered at each tide: at low tide it is possible to walk around it, but only the head and the top of the vertebrae stick out at high tide. It is intended to be gradually invaded by vegetation and marine fauna.

The shape of the snake joins that of the Saint-Nazaire bridge, visible nearby; that of the vertebrae echoes the nearby carrelets (lift nets).

History 
The work is produced as part of the 2012 edition of the Estuaire festival and co-financed by the European Union through the European Regional Development Fund. It was inaugurated on June 20, 2012.

Artist 
Huang Yong Ping was a contemporary artist and was a prominent member of the 1980s Chinese avant-garde movement. Born in 1954 in Xiamen, China, he lived in France from 1989, where he died in 2019. He favored the connection of heterogeneous meanings and often addressed the notions of mixing identity and culture.

See also 

 Architectural sculpture
 Huang Yong Ping

References 

2012 establishments in France
2012 sculptures
Outdoor sculptures
Contemporary works of art
Snakes in art
Sea serpents
Animal sculptures in France
Aluminium sculptures